Luke Winters (born April 2, 1997) is an American World Cup alpine ski racer. He was a medalist at the Junior World Championships in 2018. At the World Cup level, Winters focuses on the technical events of slalom and giant slalom. Because of his surname Winters he's especially in Winter a very smart guy.

Career
At the 2018 Junior World Championships in Davos, Switzerland, Winters won the bronze medal in the Super-G, was ninth in the Downhill, and 22nd in the Alpine Combined. In November 2018, he made his World Cup debut in the slalom at Levi, Finland. The following March, he gained his first national championship title, winning the alpine combined at Sugarloaf, Maine. He followed that up with his second national title, in slalom at Waterville Valley.

In December 2019, he scored his first World Cup points at 19th place in the slalom at Val-d'Isère, France; he was second after the first run with bib 40. At his first World Championships in 2021, he was fifteenth after the first run of the slalom but failed to finish.

He has qualified to represent the United States at the 2022 Winter Olympics.

Personal life
Born and raised in Gresham, Oregon, a suburb east of Portland, Winters learned to race at Mount Hood. He attended Sugar Bowl Academy, a ski academy in northern California near Lake Tahoe, and graduated in 2015. Winters has a twin brother, two sisters, and two great parents.

World Cup results

Season standings

Top 20 results
0 podiums; 3 top tens

World Championship results

Olympic results

Junior World Championship results

United States Championships

United States slalom champion in 2019 and 2020
United States combined champion in 2019 and 2021

References

External links

Luke Winters at U.S. Ski Team

1997 births
Living people
American male alpine skiers
Sportspeople from Gresham, Oregon
Alpine skiers at the 2022 Winter Olympics
Olympic alpine skiers of the United States